German submarine U-2337 was a Type XXIII U-boat of Nazi Germany's Kriegsmarine during World War II. She was ordered on 20 September 1943, and was laid down on 2 August 1944 at Deutsche Werft, Hamburg, as yard number 491. She was launched on 15 September 1944 and commissioned under the command of Oberleutnant zur See Günter Behnisch on 4 October 1944.

Design
Like all Type XXIII U-boats, U-2337 had a displacement of  when at the surface and  while submerged. The submarine was powered by one MWM six-cylinder RS134S diesel engine providing , one AEG GU4463-8 double-acting electric motor electric motor providing , and one BBC silent running CCR188 electric motor providing .

U-2337 was fitted with two  torpedo tubes in the bow. She could carry two preloaded torpedoes. The complement was 14 – 18 men. This class of U-boat did not carry a deck gun.

Service history
On 9 May 1945, U-2337 surrendered at Kristiansand, Norway. She was later transferred to Loch Ryan, Scotland on 29 May 1945. Of the 156 U-boats that eventually surrendered to the Allied forces at the end of the war, U-2337 was one of 116 selected to take part in Operation Deadlight. U-2337 was towed out to be sank on 28 November 1945, by gunfire from the British destroyer  and the Polish destroyer .

See also
 Battle of the Atlantic

References

Bibliography

External links

U-boats commissioned in 1944
World War II submarines of Germany
1944 ships
Type XXIII submarines
Ships built in Hamburg
Operation Deadlight
World War II shipwrecks in the Atlantic Ocean
Maritime incidents in November 1945